Al Ebb is a settlement in the municipality of Al Daayen in Qatar. It is located in the southern portion of the municipality, and is being developed as a residential hub.

Etymology
Al Ebb derived its name from the Arabic term "abba" which roughly translates to "maximum capacity". It received its name due to its defining feature being a large depression, hosting various types of plants, which would be filled with water during the rainy months.

References 

Populated places in Al Daayen